Alathur Lok Sabha constituency is one of the 20 Lok Sabha (parliamentary) constituencies in Kerala state in southern India.This constituency came into existence in 2008, following the implementation of delimitation of parliamentary constituencies based on the recommendations of the Delimitation Commission of India constituted in 2002.

Assembly segments

Alathur Lok Sabha constituency comprises the following seven legislative assembly segments:

Chelakkara, Wadakkancherry and Kunnamkulam segments were earlier in the erstwhile Ottapalam Lok Sabha constituency.

Members of Parliament

Election results

General election 2019

General election 2014

General election 2009

See also 

 Palakkad district
 Thrissur district
 Ottapalam (Lok Sabha constituency)
 Indian general election, 2014 (Kerala)

Notes

External links
Alathur Lok Sabha Elections Asianet News survey results 2019

Lok Sabha constituencies in Kerala
Politics of Palakkad district